Rush is the fourth studio album by Finnish singer Anna Abreu, released in Finland by RCA on March 30, 2011. The album was preceded by the lead single "Hysteria" in January 2011.

The album was produced by Jukka Immonen, who is known for his work with Finnish singer Jenni Vartiainen. Principal photography for the album, including its cover and those of its lead single "Hysteria", was completed in Thailand in December 2010.

Commercial performance
Rush debuted at number one on the Finnish Top 50 albums chart, becoming Abreu's third number one album and holding the top spot for one week. To date it has sold over 10,000 copies and has been certified gold by the IFPI.

Chart performance

Singles
 "Hysteria", the lead single from the album, was written by Patric Sarin, the songwriter-producer who worked with Abreu through the recording of her two previous albums Now and Just a Pretty Face?. Released on January 10, 2011, "Hysteria" debuted and peaked at number 6 on the Finnish singles chart, becoming Abreu's fifth top ten hit on the chart.
 "Worst Part is Over", featuring Finnish rapper Redrama was released as the second single from the album on April 25, 2011. The song reached number twelve on the Radio Airplay chart.
 "Stereo", the third single from the album, was released on August 25, 2011 and accompanied by a music video. The song was extremely popular with radio stations and reached number two on the Airplay Chart.
 "Be With You" was released on November 23, 2011 as the final single from the album. It was released solely for promotional purposes.

Track listing

Promotion

In 2011, Abreu promoted her fourth album with the Rush Tour throughout Finland.

Setlist

Tour dates

References

2011 albums
Anna Abreu albums